Graettinger–Terril Community School District (G-T) is a rural public school district in Iowa, with campuses in Graettinger and Terril. The district lies within four counties: Clay, Dickinson, Emmet, and Palo Alto.

In 2013, the district had 329 students.

History
It was established on July 1, 2010, as a consolidation of the Graettinger Community School District and the Terril Community School District.

In 2011, the district and the Ruthven-Ayrshire Community School District agreed to do athletic team sharing. In 2013 the district and the Ruthven-Ayrshire agreed to a partial-day sharing arrangement in that high school students may spend portions of their school days at each campus for certain courses. They began discussing the idea in October 2012. They had discussed the possibility of whole grade-sharing, but Ruthven-Ayrshire canceled those talks in January 2013, stating that it wanted to have its own students in its own high school.

On September 12, 2017, there was a $9.61 bond election for improvements in the Graettinger and Terril buildings, with a security entrance for the latter and classroom improvements for the former.

An election for a $9.7 million bond, held on April 3, 2018, and requiring 60% or more of the voters to approve, was for a regulation gymnasium and industrial arts and science classrooms at the high school facility. It was approved on a 658-410 (61.6%) basis, with Graettinger voters voting 404–108 (78.9%) in favor, Terril voters opposing it by 195–111 (36.3% in favor), and absentee ballots favoring it on a 143–101 (57.2%) basis.

Schools
The district operates three schools:
 Graettinger–Terril Elementary School, Terril
 Graettinger–Terril Middle School, Graettinger
 Graettinger–Terril High School, Graettinger

Graettinger–Terril High School

Athletics
The Titans compete in the Twin Lakes Conference in the following sports as G-T/R-A:

Cross country
Volleyball 
Football 
Basketball
Wrestling 
Track and field
Golf 
Baseball 
Softball

See also
List of school districts in Iowa
List of high schools in Iowa

References

Further reading

External links
 Graettinger-Terril Community School District

School districts in Iowa
Education in Clay County, Iowa
Education in Dickinson County, Iowa
Education in Emmet County, Iowa
Education in Palo Alto County, Iowa
2010 establishments in Iowa
School districts established in 2010